Celendín Province is a province of the Cajamarca Region in Peru. The capital of the province is the city of Celendín.

Political division 
The province measures  and is divided into twelve districts:

See also
 Mamaqucha

References 
  Provincia de Celendín :es:Provincia de Celendín. Wikipedia en español, información bastante completa.
  Instituto Nacional de Estadística e Informática. Banco de Información Digital. Retrieved November 4, 2007.

External links
  Official province web site

Provinces of the Cajamarca Region